Viktor Karlsson (born 15 April 1988) is a Swedish bandy player who currently plays for Hammarby IF Bandy.  Karlsson is a young player who was brought up by Hammarby IF.

Karlsson has played for two clubs-
 Hammarby IF Bandy (2005)
 GT-76 (2005–2006)
 Hammarby IF Bandy (from 2006)

External links
  viktor karlsson at bandysidan
  hammarby if

1988 births
Swedish bandy players
Living people
Hammarby IF Bandy players
IK Tellus Bandy players
Place of birth missing (living people)